Myer Centre may refer to various shopping centres in Australia:

 The Myer Centre, Brisbane
 Myer Centre, Adelaide